This is a list of works from American author Jayne Ann Krentz.

Arcane Society Novels 
Series is written across all three pseudonyms.

As Jayne Castle

Guinevere Jones

 The Desperate Game, 1986, reissued digitally and in audio August 2012
 The Chilling Deception, 1986, reissued digitally and in audio August 2012
 The Sinister Touch, 1986, reissued digitally and in audio August 2012
 The Fatal Fortune, 1986, reissued digitally and in audio August 2012
 Desperate and Deceptive: The Guinevere Jones Collection Volume 1, 2014 (Collects The Desperate Game and The Chilling Deception)
 Sinister and Fatal: The Guinevere Jones Collection Volume 2, 2014 (Collects The Sinister Touch and The Fatal Fortune)

Curtain Worlds

St. Helen's 
 Amaryllis, 1996
 Zinnia, 1997
 Orchid, 1998

Harmony 

 Bridal Jitters (in Charmed (1999) and Harmony (2000))

 After Dark, 2000 (in Harmony (2000) and No Going Back (2004))
 After Glow, 2004
 Ghost Hunter, 2006
 Silver Master, 2007
 Dark Light, 2008
 Obsidian Prey, 2009
 Midnight Crystal, 2010 (Book 3 of Arcane Society: The Dreamlight Trilogy)
 Canyons of Night, 2011 (Book 3 of Arcane Society: The Looking Glass Trilogy)
 The Lost Night, 2012
 Deception Cove, 2013
 The Hot Zone, 2014
 Siren's Call, 2015
 Illusion Town, 2016
 Guild Boss, 2020
 Sweetwater and the Witch, 2021

As Jayne Taylor
 Whirlwind Courtship, 1979

As Jayne Bentley

As Stephanie James
Most titles have been re-released under Jayne Ann Krentz in print or digital format.

Colter
 Fabulous Beast, 1984
 The Devil to Pay, 1985

As Jayne Ann Krentz

Lost Colony
 Sweet Starfire, 1986
 Crystal Flame, 1986
 Shield's Lady, 1989 (originally published as Amanda Glass)

Dreams
 Dream, Part One, 1988
 Dream, Part Two, 1988
 Shared Dream, 1992 (Omnibus of Dream Part One and Dream Part Two)
 Dreams: Parts 1 and 2, 2013 (kindle re-release)

Gifts
 Gift of Gold, 1988
 Gift of Fire, 1989

Ladies and Legend
 The Pirate, 1990
 The Adventurer, 1990
 The Cowboy, 1990

Eclipse Bay
 Eclipse Bay, 2000
 Dawn in Eclipse Bay, 2001
 A Summer in Eclipse Bay, 2002
 Together in Eclipse Bay, 2003 (collects all three books)

Whispering Springs
 Light in Shadow, 2002
 Truth or Dare, 2003

Arcane Society
 White Lies (Book 2), 2007
 Sizzle and Burn (Book 3), 2008
 Running Hot (Book 5), 2008
 Fired Up, 2009 (Book 1 of the Dreamlight trilogy)
 In Too Deep, 2010 (Book 1 of the Looking Glass trilogy)
 The Scargill Cove Case Files, 2011

Dark Legacy
 Copper Beach, 2012
 Dream Eyes, 2013

Cutler, Sutter & Salinas
 When All the Girls Have Gone, 2016
 Promise Not To Tell, 2018
 Untouchable, 2019

Fogg Lake
 The Vanishing, 2020
 All the Colors of the Night, 2021
 Lightning in a Mirror, 2022

The Lost Night Files
 Sleep No More, January 3, 2023

Non-fiction 
 Dangerous Men and Adventurous Women: Romance Writers on the Appeal of the Romance (also edited)

As Amanda Quick

Vanza
 With This Ring, 1998
 I Thee Wed, 1999
 Wicked Widow, 2000
 Lie by Moonlight, 2005

Lake & March
 Slightly Shady, 2001
 Don't Look Back, 2002
 Late for the Wedding, 2003

Arcane Society
Second Sight (Book 1), 1999
The Third Circle (Book 4), 2008
The Perfect Poison (Book 6), 2009
 Burning Lamp (Book 2 of the Dreamlight trilogy), 2010
 Quicksilver (Book 2 of the Looking Glass trilogy), 2011

Ladies of Lantern Street
 Crystal Gardens, 2012
 The Mystery Woman, 2013

Burning Cove, California
 The Girl Who Knew Too Much, 2017
 The Other Lady Vanishes, 2018
 Tightrope, 2019
 Close Up, 2020
 The Lady Has a Past, 2021
 When She Dreams, 2022
 The Bride Wore White, May 2, 2023

References 

Works by Jayne Ann Krentz
Romantic fiction bibliographies
